The Clover Bend Historic District encompasses a collection of historic municipal buildings in Clover Bend, Arkansas.  It consists of five buildings, centered on the Clover Bend High School, built in 1937 with funding from the Farm Security Administration (FSA).  The complex also includes four other primarily academic buildings: the gymnasium, home economics building, cafeteria, and fire station.  It was the centerpiece of a major FSA project to provide services and lifelines to the small-scale farmers of the area during the Great Depression.

The district was listed on the National Register of Historic Places in 1990.

See also
National Register of Historic Places listings in Lawrence County, Arkansas

References

Buildings and structures completed in 1937
Buildings and structures in Lawrence County, Arkansas
Historic districts on the National Register of Historic Places in Arkansas
National Register of Historic Places in Lawrence County, Arkansas